Bjørnsundet is a strait between Spitsbergen and Wilhelm Island in Hinlopen Strait, Svalbard. The strait has depths , and can be sailed by vessels.

The strait was discovered and first named Bismark Strasse by August Petermann during the First German North Polar Expedition in 1868.

References

Straits of Svalbard